Louis Berger (formerly known as Berger Group Holdings) is a full-service engineering, architecture, planning, environmental, program and construction management and economic development firm based in Morristown, New Jersey. Founded in 1953 in Harrisburg, Pennsylvania by Dr. Louis Berger, the firm employs nearly 6,000 employees in more than 50 countries worldwide.  The company was acquired by WSP Global in 2018.

The firm provides services to federal, state and local government clients, as well as to international multilateral institutions and to commercial industry. As of September 2011, Louis Berger ranked as the third largest USAID private-sector partner, and was ranked #25 in 2015 among U.S. design firms in terms of total firm revenue by Engineering News-Record.

The company has suffered setbacks in recent years with settlement of fraud charges for contracts in Afghanistan; admission of criminal responsibility to Foreign Corrupt Practices Act violations in a settlement with the US Department of Justice for bribery of governments in Asia; and a debarment by the World Bank for corrupt practices. 
In 2019, the National Transportation Safety Board determined that Louis Berger's inadequate peer review of the design contributed to the  Florida International University pedestrian bridge collapse. They were also criticized for failure to identify the significance of structural cracking and not preparing a remedial plan to address it.

History

Background
Louis Berger was founded in 1953 by Louis Berger in Harrisburg, Pennsylvania. Born in 1914 in Lawrence, Massachusetts, Dr. Berger graduated from Tufts College in 1936 with a degree in civil engineering, and earned a master’s in soils and geology from Massachusetts Institute of Technology in 1940. In 1942, Dr. Berger joined the United States Coast Guard where he designed waterfront facilities along the Mississippi River and commanded a Coast Guard base in Greenland. Upon returning from active duty, he earned his PhD in soil mechanics from Northwestern University and joined the teaching faculty at the Pennsylvania State University. In 1952, Dr. Berger left his position at Pennsylvania State University to form the engineering consulting firm that would later become Louis Berger.

Fredric S. Berger, son of the company's founder, Dr. Louis Berger, was involved with the company since 1972 and served as chairman of Louis Berger Group from 2007 until his passing in April 2015. Mr. Berger held a bachelor's in economics from Tufts University and a master of science degree in civil engineering from the Massachusetts Institute of Technology. Mr. Berger was a founding member of the American University of Afghanistan and served on the university's board from 2004 to 2015. In 2013, Mr. Berger was appointed to advisory boards for the U.S. Institute of Peace and the U.S. Trade and Development Agency.

Early years
The firm’s first major projects included design on the Pennsylvania Turnpike, the first turnpike in the U.S., and on I-80 between Denville and Netcong, the first interstate road in the state of New Jersey The firm also designed the Herat-Islam Qala Highway in Afghanistan in 1965.

International Development Work
Louis Berger began its first international project in 1959 when the firm was selected by USAID and the U.S. Army Corps of Engineers Gulf District to design a 435-mile highway between Yangon and Mandalay in Myanmar. The project was initially rejected by the Burmese government as proposed by the Corps of Engineers, but Louis Berger was able to design the project using more economical alternatives.

In December 2010, the Discovery Science Channel production team filmed 30-hours of footage of the works for the construction of a new bridge over the Sava River in Belgrade, Serbia.

In 2012, Louis Berger completed work on the Juba-Nimule Road in South Sudan under the Sudan Infrastructure Services Project. The road was the first paved highway in South Sudan and links the Sudanese capital to the town of Nimule on the Ugandan border.

Organization
Louis Berger consists of three operating companies which include a United States unit (formerly known as Louis Berger Group), an international unit, and a services unit that provides base logistics and operations support, global operations and maintenance, turnkey power solutions and fueling and facility services. Headquartered in Morristown, New Jersey, Louis Berger manages its regional operations out of offices in Washington D.C., France, United Arab Emirates, India and Panama. The company was acquired by the Canada-based WSP Global in 2018 for $400 million.

Industry Rankings
Louis Berger was ranked #25 among U.S. design firms in 2015 based on total firm revenue by Engineering News-Record and #10 among Program Management firms The firm also ranked #37 among Environmental firms in 2014.

Criticisms

Fraud in Afghanistan
In November 2010, Louis Berger agreed to pay a record $69.3 million to settle charges of fraud against the government brought under the False Claims Act. The case, filed by a whistleblower, alleged that the company billed the government for internal costs unrelated to its rebuilding contracts in Afghanistan.

Bribery in India, Vietnam, Indonesia, and Kuwait
Between 1998 and 2010, executives at the company paid bribes amounting to $3.9 million to government officials in India, Indonesia, Vietnam and Kuwait to win business in violation of the Foreign Corrupt Practices Act. A settlement agreement between the company with the US Department of Justice was announced in July 2015, in which the company admitted criminal responsibility and agreed to pay a penalty of $17.1 million. The inquiry into the company's activities in Vietnam uncovered corrupt payments to government officials in the Third Rural Transport and Da Nang Priority Infrastructure Investment Projects, both World Bank funded projects. The World Bank imposed a one-year debarment on firm for engaging in "corrupt practices" in February 2015.

Protection payments to Taliban
According to the lawsuit, filed in December 2019 in the D.C. District Court on behalf of Gold Star families, some U.S. contractors involved in Afghanistan's reconstruction projects, including Louis Berger Group, made illegal "protection payments" to the Taliban, funding a "Taliban-led terrorist insurgency" that killed or wounded thousands of Americans in Afghanistan. In 2009, then-Secretary of State Hillary Clinton said that the "protection money" was "one of the major sources of funding for the Taliban."

Key Projects

Roads and Bridges
Dragon River Bridge, Vietnam
Bang Na Expressway, Thailand
Kabul-Kandahar Highway, Afghanistan
Third Bridge over Panama Canal, Panama
Ada Bridge, Serbia
Pennsylvania Turnpike, Pennsylvania
Juba-Nimule Road, South Sudan
Ohmi-Odori Bridge, Japan

Aviation
Suvarnabhumi Airport
Sir Seewoosagur Ramgoolam International Airport
Ovda Air Base
Queen Alia International Airport

Rail
Kamalapur railway station
Doha Metro
MRT Blue Line
Mumbai Monorail
North South Railway (Saudi Arabia)

Maritime
Port at Lekki
Port of Santos

Other Projects
Lincoln Memorial Reflecting Pool
Kajaki Dam

See also
 Hermanos Serdán International Airport
 Kabul-Kandahar Highway
 Pennsylvania Turnpike
 Third Bridge over Panama Canal

References

American civil engineering contractors
Engineering consulting firms of the United States
International engineering consulting firms
Construction and civil engineering companies of the United States
Construction and civil engineering companies established in 1953
1953 establishments in Pennsylvania